Tomas Rosenkvist (born 23 June 1975) is a Swedish former football midfielder.

References

1975 births
Living people
Swedish footballers
Sweden youth international footballers
Sweden under-21 international footballers
Västra Frölunda IF players
IFK Göteborg players
GAIS players
Association football midfielders
Allsvenskan players
Superettan players